Hirtella zanzibarica subsp. megacarpa is a subspecies of flowering plant in the family Chrysobalanaceae. It is endemic to Tanzania.

References

zanzibarica subsp. megacarpa
Endemic flora of Tanzania
Near threatened plants
Taxonomy articles created by Polbot
Plant subspecies